Wish You Were Here is an American sitcom that was premiered on July 20, 1990, as a summer replacement on CBS in the 9:30pm slot which lasted for only six episodes. Its premise was that a stockbroker, Donny Cogswell, portrayed by Lew Schneider, quits his job and sends video cassette postcards of his European adventures to family and friends back in the United States.

Cast
Lew Schneider as Donny Cogswell
Sándor Szabó as Grandpa Ziggy
Anna Feher as Anna
Vince Metcalfe as Stan
Tom Riis Farrell as Gary
Jayne Eastwood as Stella

Plot
Donny Cogswell, a stockbroker on Wall Street in New York acquires a new video camera. He begins recording with it much to the chagrin of his boss who notes Donny's attitude problem. Donny decides to quit his job before being fired (all the while recording his conversation with his boss) and to travel the world with his camcorder, mailing videotapes of his adventures and interviews he conducts with local people back to his family, friends and girlfriend in the USA near Cleveland. Sometimes his destinations are chosen by other characters met along the way.

Episode air dates and destinations
 Paris, France (July 20, 1990)
 Budapest, Hungary (July 27, 1990)
 Barcelona, Catalonia, Spain (August 3, 1990)
 Marrakech, Morocco (August 10, 1990)
 The French Riviera, Côte d'Azur, France (August 17, 1990)
 The Balkans (August 24, 1990)

Production
Some, if not all, of the footage from Donny's camera was shot on Hi-8mm videotape.

Production crew
Created by Steven Bawol
Produced by Carole Hart, Robert Altman, Stephen Skip Lane, Steven Bawol
Directed by George Mihalka, Nail Leonard, Steve Bawol, Bob Altman
Written by Steven Bawol, Sean Kelly, Peter Tolan
Director of photography, Robert Draper
Story editor, Sean Kelly
Costumes by Candice Clements
Line producer, Rémi Kessler
Production designer, Mike Moran
Executive producers - Carole Hart, Marlo Thomas & Katie Berlin Productions and Bob Altman, Steve Bawol and Stephen Skip Lane
Developed by Those Guys International; Stephen Skip Lane, CEO

External links

CBS original programming
1990 American television series debuts
1990 American television series endings
1990s American sitcoms
English-language television shows
Television series by CBS Studios